Auburn Fire House No. 1, also known as Auburn Hose Company No. 1, at El Dorado St. & Lincoln Way in Auburn, Placer County, California, was built in 1888.  It was listed on the National Register of Historic Places in 2011.

It includes elements of Stick/Eastlake and Queen Anne styles.

The station was rededicated in a ceremony in 2013, at its 125th year mark, after a decade of restoration by volunteers.

See also 
 Auburn City Hall and Fire House
 Auburn Fire House No. 2
 National Register of Historic Places listings in Placer County, California

References

Fire stations on the National Register of Historic Places in California
National Register of Historic Places in Placer County, California
Queen Anne architecture in California
Fire stations completed in 1888
Stick-Eastlake architecture in the United States
1888 establishments in California
Auburn, California